Odprava zelenega zmaja is a novel by Slovenian author Slavko Pregl. It was first published in 1976.

See also
List of Slovenian novels

Slovenian novels
1976 novels